Las Colinas are a mountain range in Kings County, California.

References 

Mountain ranges of Northern California
Mountain ranges of Kings County, California